Chaos (stylized as CHAOS) is an American comedic drama television series that aired on CBS from April 1, to July 16, 2011, as a mid-season replacement for The Defenders.

Premise
Threats to national security are investigated by a group of rogue CIA spies in the division of Clandestine Homeland Administration and Oversight Services (CHAOS), also trying to keep their jobs from being eliminated due to budget cuts. New agent Rick Martinez (Freddy Rodriguez) joins the team as an in-house mole for CIA National Clandestine Service Director H.J. Higgins (Kurtwood Smith). However, Martinez is quickly found out by the ODS (Office of Disruptive Services) team, who "turn" him for their own use.

Cast

 Freddy Rodriguez as CIA Field Agent/Operative Rick Martinez
 Christina Cole as NCS Deputy Director Adele Ferrer
 Carmen Ejogo as Intelligence Officer Fay Carson
 James Murray as Field Agent/Operative Billy Collins
 Tim Blake Nelson as Field Agent/Operative Casey Malick
 Eric Close as Field Agent/Operative Michael Dorset
 Kurtwood Smith as NCS Director H. J. Higgins

Development and production
In January 2010, CBS ordered production of a pilot written by Tom Spezialy. Casting announcements began in mid-February, with Freddy Rodriguez being the first actor cast. Next to come on board were James Murray and Tim Blake Nelson. Eric Close joined the cast in early March, followed by Carmen Ejogo. Finally, Stephen Rea completed the main cast in mid-March. The pilot was filmed in Los Angeles.

In late July, CBS announced that it had officially ordered 13 episodes of the series for a mid-season start. Kurtwood Smith joined the cast in November 2010, replacing Rea in the role of Director H.J. Higgins.

Starting in mid-December 2010, CHAOS film crews were spotted and the actors photographed at various set locations around Vancouver – at the Vancouver Rowing Club, in Gastown, on the rooftop of The Bay, at the Terminal City Iron Works, and at mansions in the Shaughnessy and Point Grey neighborhoods – with these locations standing in for exotic locales around the world.

On April 15, 2011, the CBS series went on hiatus after 3 episodes due to low ratings.

After CHAOS was removed from CBS's schedule on April 19, filming on the remaining episodes continued in and around Vancouver until the originally scheduled completion date of May 2.

Episodes
For unknown reasons CBS aired the episodes out of chronological order. The production codes in the episode table reveal the originally intended order.

International distribution
In Canada, the show was simsubbed on the Global Television Network. In New Zealand, the show had a late-night slot from October 4, 2013 through to the end of December on TV3.

Reception

Critical reception
Metacritic assigned CHAOS a score of 50, signifying mixed or average reviews.

Ratings
The series premiered with 6.53 million viewers and a 1.1 rating in the adults 18–49 demo. The rating equaled the lowest ratings achieved by Medium and The Defenders in the same slot, also the lowest rating for any CBS drama this season.

Hiatus
CBS removed the series from the schedule on April 18, 2011, after airing three episodes of the 13-episode order, and placed it on hiatus. The series resumed with episode 4 and episode 5 on May 28. The final episodes aired on Saturdays at 8 pm Eastern.

Awards
Series star Freddy Rodriguez won an Imagen Award in the category "Best Actor/Television" from The Imagen Foundation for his role as Rick Martinez in CHAOS on August 12, 2011.

References

External links

Press Releases for each episode at TheFutonCritic

2010s American comedy-drama television series
2011 American television series debuts
2011 American television series endings
American action adventure television series
CBS original programming
English-language television shows
Espionage television series
Television series by 20th Century Fox Television
Television series by CBS Studios
Television shows filmed in Vancouver
Television shows set in Virginia